The Journal of Nanoscience and Nanotechnology is published by American Scientific Publishers, a company identified as a predatory publisher on Beall's List. It was delisted from Web of Science in the 2019 index, after having received an expression of concern a year earlier.

The journal publishes all aspects of nanoscale science and technology dealing with materials synthesis, processing, nanofabrication, nanoprobes, spectroscopy, properties, biological systems, nanostructures, theory and computation, nanoelectronics, nano-optics, nano-mechanics, nanodevices, nanobiotechnology, nanomedicine, nanotoxicology.

References

External links 
 

Nanotechnology journals
Monthly journals
Publications established in 2001
English-language journals